Melrose Township is one of fifteen townships in Illinois, USA.  As of the 2010 census, the population is 352 and it has 164 housing units.

Geography

Unincorporated towns
 Melrose
(This list is based on USGS data and may include former settlements.)

Cemeteries
The township contains these six cemeteries: Bailiff, Liberty, Medsker, Mount Olive, Ohio and Plymouth.

Lakes
 Craig Lake

Demographics

School districts
 Hutsonville Community Unit School District 1
 Marshall Community Unit School District 2c
 Martinsville Community Unit School District 3c

Political districts
 Illinois' 15th congressional district
 State House District 109
 State Senate District 55

References
 
 United States Census Bureau 2007 TIGER/Line Shapefiles
 United States National Atlas

External links
 City-Data.com
 Illinois State Archives

Townships in Clark County, Illinois
Townships in Illinois